The Eritrean People's Revolutionary Party (EPRP) was a clandestine Marxist-Leninist political party in Eritrea during that country's war of independence. Founded in 1971 and associated with the Eritrean People's Liberation Front, it was chaired by future Eritrean president Isaias Afewerki. The EPRP was dissolved in 1989.

References 
 Gebru Tareke. The Ethiopian Revolution: War in the Horn of Africa. New Haven: Yale University Press, 2009. pp. 67-68. 

Political parties established in 1971
Political parties disestablished in 1989
Political parties in Eritrea
Communist parties in Africa